Protithona is a genus of moths belonging to the family Tortricidae.

Species
Protithona fugitivana Meyrick, 1883
Protithona potamias (Meyrick, 1909)

Former species
Protithona varia Meyrick, 1883

See also
List of Tortricidae genera

References

External links
tortricidae.com

Eucosmini
Tortricidae genera
Taxa named by Edward Meyrick